Alexei Rojas Fedorushchenko (born 28 September 2005) is a footballer who plays as a goalkeeper for the youth academy of Arsenal. Born in England, he is a Colombia youth international.

Club career
Rojas began playing football with Boreham Wood at the age of 5, and thereafter had stints with St Albans City and London Colney Colts. He joined the youth academy of English Premier League side Arsenal in 2019.

International career
Rojas is eligible to represent England internationally, having been born there, Colombia, through his father, and Russia internationally through his mother.

Youth
On 4 January 2023, Rojas, received a call-up from Colombia U20 manager Héctor Cárdenas for the highly anticipated 2023 South American U-20 Championship, held in Colombia. Despite being part of the talented squad that managed to secure a third place finish, Rojas remained an unused substitute throughout the tournament, with the experienced Luis Marquinez taking the role of first-choice goalkeeper.

References

External links
 

Living people
2005 births
Sportspeople from Basildon
Colombian footballers
Colombia youth international footballers
English footballers
Colombian people of Russian descent
English people of Colombian descent
English people of Russian descent
Association football goalkeepers
Arsenal F.C. players